Daniel Coleman (born 1 January 1984) is a Ghanaian football player.

Career 
Coleman began his career by Hearts of Oak and joined in January 2005 on loan to Al-Nasr, before turned back to Hearts in January 2006. On 30 August 2009 the Team-Captain of Hearts of Oak left his club to sign for Real Tamale United. He was sacked by his former club Real Tamale United and became a free agent.

After retirement Coleman began a music career.

International career 
He was part of the Ghanaian 2004 Olympic football team which exited in the first round, having finished in third place in group B. He played 2005 one game for the Ghana national football team.

References 

1984 births
Living people
Ghanaian footballers
Ghanaian expatriate footballers
Olympic footballers of Ghana
Footballers at the 2004 Summer Olympics
Accra Hearts of Oak S.C. players
Al Nassr FC players
Real Tamale United players
Ghana Premier League players
Saudi Professional League players
Expatriate footballers in Saudi Arabia
Ghanaian expatriate sportspeople in Saudi Arabia
Association football defenders
Ghana international footballers